On August 14, 1826, Henry Wilson (J) of  died.  A special election was held to fill the resulting vacancy on October 10, 1826.

Election results

Krebs took his seat at the start of the Second Session of the 19th Congress.

See also
List of special elections to the United States House of Representatives

References

Pennsylvania 1826 07
Pennsylvania 1826 07
1826 07
Pennsylvania 07
United States House of Representatives 07
United States House of Representatives 1826 07
October 1826 events